Horšovský Týn is a town in Domažlice District in the Plzeň Region of the Czech Republic. It has about 4,800 inhabitants. The historic town centre is well preserved and is protected by law as an urban monument reservation.

Administrative parts

The town is made up of 8 town parts (Město, Plzeňské Předměstí, Malé Předměstí, Velké Předměstí, Nová Ves, Svatá Anna, Podhájí, and Lazce) and 13 villages (Borovice, Dolní Metelsko, Hašov, Horní Metelsko, Horšov, Kocourov, Oplotec, Podražnice, Semošice, Svinná, Tasnovice, Valdorf and Věvrov).

Etymology
The Old Czech word týn is related to English "town". It was a term for a fortified settlement. The settlement was administered from Horšov (today a part of Horšovský Týn), hence the name which means "Horšov's Týn".

Geography
It lies on the Radbuza River. It is situated on the border between the Plasy Uplands and the Upper Palatine Forest Foothills.

History
A merchant village on a trade route from Prague to Regensburg probably existed here in the 10th century. In 973, the area was donated by Duke Boleslaus II to the newly established bishopric of Prague. The first written mention of Horšovský Týn is from 1184.

A settlement was established on the right bank of the Radbuza river and administered from nearby Horšov. In the mid-13th century, it became more important than Horšov, a castle was built here, and it became the seat of the estate. King Charles IV, promoted the village to a town and allowed to build fortification walls. The walls were not built around the entire perimeter of the town, and so the town was besieged and conquered during the Hussite Wars between 1422 and 1431.

In 1542, the House of Lobkowicz bought the Horšovský Týn estate. Thanks to the business activities of the family, the estate became one of the ten largest estates in Bohemia at the turn of the 16th and 17th centuries. After the fire in 1547, the town was rebuilt in the Renaissance style. Horšovský Týn was confiscated from the Lobkowicz family after the Bohemian Revolt in 1620.

After the Thirty Years' War, Horšovský Týn passed to the counts on Trauttmansdorff, in whose possession the castle remained until 1945. In the second half of the 17th century and in the 18th century, the town was germanised. The improving economic situation was reflected in the character of the town. The buildings were given a baroque and rococo appearance, which has been preserved in the historical centre to this day.

In 1900, the railroad to the town was built. During the late 19th century and especially after 1918 Czechs began moving into the district in large numbers. From 1938 to 1945, the town and the region were annexed into Nazi Germany and administered as part of the Reichsgau Sudetenland. Until 1945 the area was populated by ethnic Germans. These people were expelled by the Beneš decrees following World War II.

Demographics

Transport
The I/26 road from Plzeň to the Czech-German border runs through Horšovský Týn.

Sights

The main landmark is the Horšovský Týn Castle. It was originally an early Gothic castle. After it was damaged by a fire in 1547, it was rebuilt into a modern Renaissance residence in 1550. The castle is valuable because it was not rebuilt after that. Much of the original Gothic castle, the palace portals and some rooms have also been preserved.

The castle includes an almost  large castle park. The Italian-style Renaissance gardens from 1550 were rebuilt into an English park in 1880. In 1905, it was converted into a landscaped park. The park contain a gloriet, a summer house and a Loreto chapel.

The Church of All Saints in Horšov is as old as the town and belongs to the most valuable sacral buildings of West Bohemia. The Romanesque church was rebuilt in the Gothic style in the 1360 and retained such a character to this day. The interior was baroque remodelled in 1745.

The Church of Saints Peter and Paul dates from the 15th century. In the early 18th century, it was baroque reconstructed and extended.

Other notable buildings in the town are a former Capuchin monastery and the Gothic Church of Saint Apollinaris.

Notable people
Raphael Sobiehrd-Mnishovsky (1580–1644), lawyer and writer
Felix Kadlinský (1613–1675), writer and translator
Joseph Johann von Littrow (1781–1840), Austrian astronomer
Josef Steinbach (1879–1937), Austrian weightlifter

Twin towns – sister cities

Horšovský Týn is twinned with:
 Maarkedal, Belgium
 Nabburg, Germany

Gallery

References

External links

Týn Castle on travel.cz

 
Cities and towns in the Czech Republic
Populated places in Domažlice District